Petr Wojnar (born 12 January 1989) is a Czech football player who plays as a midfielder.

He was a member of the Czech under-20 squad in the 2009 FIFA U-20 World Cup.

References

External links
  
 
 
 

1989 births
Living people
Sportspeople from Třinec
Czech footballers
Czech Republic youth international footballers
Czech Republic under-21 international footballers
Czech First League players
FC Baník Ostrava players
SK Kladno players
FK Mladá Boleslav players
MFK Karviná players
FK Dukla Banská Bystrica players
Expatriate footballers in Slovakia
Association football midfielders